Jay Steagall (born December 16, 1976) is an American politician who has served in the Oklahoma House of Representatives from the 43rd district since 2018.

References

1976 births
Living people
Republican Party members of the Oklahoma House of Representatives
21st-century American politicians